Who Killed Santa Claus? is a 1941 French comedy-drama film by Christian-Jaque. This adaptation of Pierre Véry's novel of the same name was the first film produced by Continental Films.

Cast
 Harry Baur as Gaspard Cornusse
 Raymond Rouleau as Roland de La Faille
 Renée Faure as Catherine Cornusse
 Robert Le Vigan as Léon Villard, the schoolmaster
 Fernand Ledoux as Noirgoutte, the mayor
 Jean Brochard as Ricomet, the pharmacist
 Héléna Manson as Marie Coquillot
 Arthur Devère as Tairraz, the watchmaker
 Marcel Pérès as Rambert
 Georges Chamarat as Constable Gercourt
 Bernard Blier as police sergeant
 Jean Sinoël as Noblet
 Marie-Hélène Dasté as Mother Michel
 Jean Parédès as Kappel, the beadle

References

External links
 

1940s Christmas drama films
1941 films
French black-and-white films
Films directed by Christian-Jaque
French Christmas drama films
Films set in France
Films based on works by Pierre Véry
1941 drama films
Tobis Film films
1940s French-language films
Continental Films films
1940s French films